Elena Rodina may refer to:

Olena Rodina (born 1975), Ukrainian cross-country skier
Yelena Rodina (born 1967), Russian high jumper later known under married name Yelena Gulyayeva